Traditional Jewish chronology (aka Jewish timekeeping). Jewish tradition has long preserved a record of dates and time sequences of important historical events related to the Jewish nation, including but not limited to the dates fixed for the building and destruction of the Second Temple, and which same fixed points in time (henceforth: chronological dates) are well-documented and supported by ancient works, although when compared to the synchronistic chronological tables of modern-day chroniclers, belabored mostly by western scholars of history, they are, notwithstanding, often at variance with their modern dating system. Discrepancies between the two systems may be as much as 2 years, or well-over 100 years, depending on the event. Prior to the adoption of the BC / AD era of computation and its synchronization with the regnal years of kings and Caesars recorded in historical records, Jews made use of the earlier Seleucid era counting (also known as the Year of Alexander), or, in Hebrew, minyan li-šṭarōth ("era of contracts"), by which historical dates were marked, from the time of Alexander the Great.

In ordinary time-keeping, often one single, major event was used as a datum point for reckoning time, meaning, given the enormity of a certain event, historians would make note of how long time had passed since that very event in relation to some later event, as is also the case in Jewish chronology.

Brief history of chronology
The Greek historian Timaeus of Tauromenium (c. 365 BCE–260 BCE) introduced the system of reckoning by Olympiads. Nepos is generally acclaimed to have been the first Roman writer of chronography. He marks the birth of Alexander the Great in the 385th year after the foundation of Rome, giving also the names of the consuls for that year.  Rome's founding, or what is known as "A.U.C.," ab urbe condita, "from the foundation of the city [of Rome]," is fixed by Nepos, as also by Polybius, as falling in "the second year of the seventh Olympiad," a year corresponding roughly with 751/0 BCE. Like ancient Hebrew writers of history, their delineations of imperial chronology were centered mostly around provincial, or local, history.

Josephus, when bringing down the regnal years of the Babylonian kings who feature highly in Israel's history, cites the third book of Berossus.

Manetho, who was a high priest and scribe of Egypt, copied down from the ancient Egyptian inscriptions a chronological list of eight early Persian kings for Ptolemy Philadelphus (266 BCE – 228 BCE), beginning with Cambyses, the son of Cyrus the Great, and omitting only the magi's interim rule.

Suetonius' De vita Caesarum (Lives of the Caesars), Josephus' The Jewish War, and Epiphanius' On Weights and Measures (Syriac version), all have attempted to accurately portray the regnal years of the Roman emperors, and, despite their good efforts, there are still discrepancies between them. These variants will invariably lead to discrepancies in the accepted chronologies. In Jerome's Chronici Canones (Chronicle) which he completed in 381 CE, the first regnal year of Julius Caesar, the first Roman emperor: Romanorum primus Caius Iulius Caesar, is marked as 48 BCE, but which Jerome in his original document had written in Roman numerals and given only the number of the Olympiad for events, and no more. Indeed, the corresponding BCE dates which are now present in this work are only the additions of the modern editor, Rudolf Helm.

"For modern scholarship the problem," in E.J. Bickerman's words, "is 'how we know Caesar was assassinated on March 15, 44 BC[E].' Before 480 BC[E], no date can be precise in terms of the Julian calendar unless confirmed by astronomical phenomena." There is also considerable disagreement among scholarship as to when to reckon the beginning of Augustus Caesar's imperium.  

Echoing these great difficulties in chronological notations, D. MacNaughton wrote: "Systems of ancient chronology, propounded even since the days of George Smith, have been many and various, and while in one year one date is assigned with an air of finality to a certain king, a few years later the date is abandoned as erroneous. These changes are natural." In fact, it has taken many hundreds of years for scholars to arrive at the dates that are now assumed to be accurate, as purported by Grafton in his book on "Joseph Scaliger," and where he shows how long it took for Roman consular dates (and archon dates, etc.) to be converted into BC/AD. All the ancient dating systems had to be aligned and converted into the modern system, and cross-referenced, and where others were not easily translatable.

For the chronologies of Babylonian kings till the fall of Babylon, as well as the chronologies of Persian kings, beginning with Cyrus the Great, modern-day historians rely principally upon the work Ptolemy's canon.

Cornerstones in Jewish tradition
Amongst Jews, the era known as the Seleucid era has been used in antiquity to mark chronological events. It was used extensively by Sherira Gaon in the writing of his Iggeret. The practice of reckoning years by this system is mentioned in the Babylonian Talmud (Avodah Zarah 10a): "Said Rav Nahman: In the Diaspora, it is not permissible to count [the date in years] except only by the kings of the Grecians." Its usage was common throughout the Jewish world until the sixteenth century, and has been used by Yemenite Diaspora Jews as late as the 1940s, until their immigration to the Land of Israel. By their recollection of the current calendar year, it is shown to have started in the Fall (Tishri) of 312 BCE, which agrees with modern scholarship (312/311).

It is disputed, however, how Alexander the Great fits-in with this Hellenistic dating era. Talmudic exegete, Rabbeinu Chananel, following Seder Olam, alleged that the Seleucid era commenced in the 6th-year of the reign of Alexander the Great, and that there were 40 years from the building of the Second Temple (during the reign of the Persian king Darius the Great) until the 6th year of the reign of Alexander the Great, namely, in 312 BCE. According to Rabbeinu Chananel, this 40-year period marked the building of the Second Temple under Darius the Great in 352 BCE and the beginning of Grecian hegemony over Israel in 312 BCE. Modern-day chroniclers assign different dates for Alexander's reign. Modern-day chroniclers also contend that from Darius the Great who laid the foundation of the Second Temple to Alexander the Great there was a span of 190 years, rather than a mere 40 years.

According to Josephus, Alexander the Great died in the 114th Olympiad, after reigning 12 years. If so, the 114th Olympiad would have corresponded with about 326 BCE, or what was then 15 years before they began to make use of the Seleucid era counting! Others put his death in 323 BCE, 12 years before the start of the Seleucid era. It is said that the Jews started this system of reckoning the years, in recognition of Alexander the Great who passed through their country and who received warmly the Jewish High Priest who came out to greet him. Others say that the introduction of this new era was in commemoration of the year in which Seleucus I reconquered Babylon.

The advantage of the Seleucid era counting system is that dates marked in this era do not require later synchronization with the BC / AD era configurations based on kings' reigns, configurations added later by modern chroniclers when trying to fixate the regnal years of various kings. Rather, all that was required of the Seleucid era counting was to simply convert it into the date used in the Common Era, without consideration for the rest. While the Seleucid Era counting has been abandoned in the writing of legal deeds, promissory notes, court attestations, etc., it is still relied upon by all observant Jews when determining the 2nd Temple's destruction. It is also considered very reliable when seeking to determine dates of events in relation to the Common Era, making for a more precise fixation of an event. 

Another reason for the popularity of the Seleucid era counting amongst Jews is that the commencement of the Seleucid era was seen as a key fixed point of reference, being, according to Seder Olam, 1,000 years after the giving of the law at Sinai, or, precisely one-thousand years after Israel's departure out of Egypt. 

Typically, a Jewish date is only informative if it can be identified in relation to some other point of reference, in this case, usually another calendar. Today, however, Jews make use of the era known as Anno Mundi, the "era of creation," in their transaction of dates.

Second Temple: Its years of duration and year of destruction
Jewish tradition holds that the Second Temple stood for 420 years. The same Jewish tradition holds that the Second Temple was destroyed in the lunar month Av (August), in the year 68 of the Common Era (rather than in year 70), naturally implying that the Second Temple was built in the year 352 BCE. Since it was during the reign of the Persian king, Darius the Great (Darius b. Hystaspes), that the Second Temple was constructed, in the sixth-year of his reign, the timeframe given for this Persian king in Jewish chronology (whose reign, accordingly, began in 358 BCE) stands at variance with the time-frame given for the same king in conventional chronology (who is said to have reigned between 521 BCE–486 BCE), a 163-year disparity.

Jews have traditionally held the view that the date in which they are to reckon the 2nd Temple's destruction is the year which preceded the 380th year of the Seleucid era, also known as the Year of Alexander (a date which corresponds to anno 69 CE). This means the destruction of the 2nd Temple fell out in the lunar month of Av in the 379th year of the Seleucid era counting (Year of Alexander), or what corresponds to anno 68 CE.

The two most ancient historical sources used to support this tradition are the Jewish historian Josephus, citing the Book of Maccabees, and the Aramaic Scroll of Antiochus (compiled, according to Saadia Gaon, by the elders of the Schools of Hillel and Shammai). The Scroll of Antiochus would have been written in the early first century CE, before Suetonius wrote his Lives of the Caesars. However, there is a proclivity among modern-day chroniclers to bypass these Jewish sources, in favor of others.

According to the Aramaic Scroll of Antiochus, from the Second Temple's rebuilding till the 23rd year of the reign of Antiochus Eupator, son of Antiochus Epiphanes who invaded Judaea, there had transpired 213 years in total (i.e. since the Second Temple's construction under Darius). Quoting verbatim from that ancient Aramaic record:
 

(Literal translation: In the twenty third year of his kingdom, in the two-hundred and thirteenth year of the rebuilding of this, God's house, he (Antiochus Eupator) put his face to go up to Jerusalem.)

This time period given for Antiochus Eupator's reign is taken in conjunction with another record mentioned by Josephus, in his Antiquities of the Jews (12.9.2.). Based on Josephus' record, who cites from the First Book of Maccabees (6:16), Antiochus Eupator began his reign after his father's death (Antiochus Epiphanes) in anno 149 of the Seleucid era (= 162 BCE). Twenty-three years into Antiochus Eupator's reign would have then been anno 172 of the Seleucid Era, or what was then 139 BCE. Since, according to the Scroll of Antiochus, the Second Temple had already been standing 213 years, this means that the Second Temple was completed in anno 352 BCE, being what was then the 6th year of the reign of Darius the king (i.e. Darius, the son of Hystaspes), the year in which the king finished its building according to Ezra 6:15. Jewish tradition, which assigns 420 years to its duration, means that its destruction occurred in 68 CE.

Although this date of the Temple's rebuilding largely disagrees with modern scholarship who base their chronologies upon the Babylonian Chronicles and its rebuilding in 516 BCE when Darius I was thought to have reigned, it has, nonetheless, long been held by religious Jewish circles as being accurate and reliable, since it is founded upon a tradition passed down generation after generation. Modern scholars seek to rectify this apparent disparity in time by saying that "the Darius in whose reign the Second Temple was built, was not Darius I, as is commonly supposed, but Darius II." In this case, the chronology thus established is in striking agreement with certain chronological data or implications in Josephus and rabbinic literature. If, however, the Darius in whose reign the Second Temple was built was Darius I, the date of its construction must, of necessity, be pulled back earlier to 516 BCE.

Counter-arguments against Seder Olam
The Greek historian Herodotus lived from circa 484 BCE to 425 BCE, and wrote about the dynastic history of four Persian kings in nine books: Cyrus (557–530 BCE, Book 1); Cambyses (530-522 BCE, Book 2 and part of Book 3); Darius (521-486 BCE, the rest of Book 3 and Books 4,5,6); and Xerxes (486-479 BCE, Books 7, 8, 9).

One of the strongest counter-arguments that can be made against Seder Olam and its demarcations in time is that, if the Second Temple was completed in the 6th year of the reign of Darius the Great, as noted by the Hebrew scriptures, and which Temple, according to Seder Olam, stood 420 years and was built in 352 BCE, this would put the Greek historian Herodotus as having written his Histories (compiled c. 430 BCE) long before the event detailing Darius' actions ever having taken place, or some 72 years before Darius the Great ever came to power! Based on the year in which Herodotus completed his Histories, and where he mentions Cyrus the Great as reigning 29 years, and his son Cambyses reigning 5 years, and Darius the Great reigning 36 years, this would point to a time much earlier than that presumed to have happened for these same events based on Seder Olam. These four kings were all before Herodotus died, as Herodotus could not possibly have written about kings that, according to the Seder Olam, supposedly lived after his time.

In conclusion, the terminus post quem for the Second Temple's construction would have been before Herodotus wrote his Histories. These arguments point to the primacy of Josephus' chronological timetable over those written in Seder Olam.

According to the Chronicle of Jerome, Herodotus became well-known in the 78th Olympiad, meaning, between 378 BCE–375 BCE, about 52–55 years after compiling his Histories.

Another difficulty with Seder Olam is in its chronological list of successive Babylonian and Persian kings (chapters 28–29), during the one-hundred years prior to the building of the Second Temple, and which stands in stark contrast to the earlier historical records for the same kings, as penned by Josephus who cites Berossus, as well as by Manetho and by Ptolemy of Alexandria in his Canon.

Seder Olam has contracted the Persian period into 34 years, explained by Rashi to mean the time span between the building of the Second Temple under Darius in 352 BC (according to Jewish calculations) and Alexander the Great's rise to power in 318 BCE. This time-frame, therefore, does not signify the end of the dynasties in Persia, but rather of their rule and hegemony over Israel before Alexander the Great rose to power. The difficulty besetting this explanation, however, lies in the fact that from Darius I who laid the foundation of the Second Temple to Alexander the Great, who brought an end to Persian hegemony over Israel, there are collected no less than 190 years. This would suggest that the author of Seder Olam confounded Darius I with Darius III Codomannus, the latter Darius being a contemporary with Alexander the Great.

The Sabbatical year as a means to determine events
The Jubilee and Sabbatical year provided a long-term means for dating events. Unfortunately, the Jewish method of calculating the recurring Sabbatical year (Shmita) has been greatly misunderstood by modern chroniclers of history, owing to their unfamiliarity with Jewish practice, largely due to its being ensconced in the Hebrew language, and which has led to many speculations and inconsistencies in computations. According to Maimonides (Mishne Torah, Hil. Shmita ve-Yovel 10:7), during the Second Temple period, the seven-year cycle which repeated itself every seven years was actually dependent upon the fixation of the Jubilee, or the fiftieth year, which year temporarily broke off the counting of the seven-year cycle. Moreover, the laws governing the Jubilee (e.g. release of Hebrew bondmen, and the return of leased property to its original owners, etc.) were never applied all throughout the Second Temple period, but the Jubilee was being used during the period of the Second Temple in order to fix and sanctify thereby the Sabbatical year. A Sabbatical year could not be fixed without the year of the Jubilee, since the Jubilee serves to break-off the 7 x 7-year cycle, before resuming its count once again in the 51st year. While the 49th year is also a Sabbatical year, the fiftieth year is not the 1st year in a new seven-year cycle, but rather is the Jubilee. Its number is not incorporated into the seven-year cycle. Rather, the new seven-year cycle begins afresh in the 51st year, and in this manner is the cycle repeated. After the Temple's destruction, the people began a new practice to number each seventh year as a Sabbatical year, without the necessity of adding a fiftieth year.

According to Maimonides (1138-1205), the reckoning of the Sabbatical years and Jubilees was renewed in Israel when Ezra the Scribe came up to the land in the Temple's seventh year (346 BCE), and which same year became the 1st-year of the seven-year cycle, the first Sabbatical year being made seven years later when the Temple had stood for thirteen years. Maimonides, in his Responsa, repeats the same claims, but is less specific. Prior to Ezra's arrival, the Sabbatical years and Jubilee had been broken-off during the years of exile. This renewed counting, which Ezra initiated in the Temple's seventh year (six years after its rebuilding), happened to fall in anno 346 BCE, which year marked the 1st year of the new seven-year cycle.

Arguments in favor of the priority of this Jewish tradition are had in a statement made in the First Book of Maccabees, and later cited by Josephus in his Antiquities, where it is learnt that the "year 150 of the Seleucid dominion" was a Sabbatical year in the Land of Israel. This same year corresponds to the Fall of 162 BCE (lunar month Tishri), continuing unto the Fall of the following year in 161 BCE (lunar month Elul). By taking the year in which the seven-year cycle was reinstated in Israel with Ezra's return in 346 BCE (accounting for the adjustment of the Jubilee every 50 years and beginning anew the seven-year cycle in the 51st year), the year 162/161 BCE (being the 150th year of the Seleucid era) was, indeed, a Sabbatical year.

Other Sabbatical years mentioned by Josephus are anno 178 Seleucid era, corresponding with 134 BCE–133 BCE, and anno 271 Seleucid era, corresponding with 41 BCE–40 BCE, when Herod and Sosius captured Jerusalem, effectively ending the Hasmonean dominion. Moreover, according to Jewish tradition, the destruction of, both, the First and the Second Temple was in a post-sabbatical year, meaning, in the 1st year of the seven-year cycle. In all these cases, the dates of these events as brought down by conventional non-Jewish chronology cannot possibly coincide with the Sabbatical year and still be faithful to the Seleucid era counting. Only when viewed through the lens of Jewish tradition is there complete harmony in these dates.

Josephus' timeline of events
It is difficult to reconcile Josephus' history of the Second Temple period with that of rabbinic tradition, if not impossible. Although the Seleucid era dates and Olympiads penned by Josephus are, indeed, accurate (see infra) and do not contradict rabbinic tradition, Josephus' accounts of the Jewish high priests and the great span of time in which they all officiated would make the Second Temple appear to have stood six-hundred and thirty-nine years.

Josephus, in his historical works, often makes use of the Seleucid era counting to mark important events, as well as the Olympiad era. Occasionally, he will use both dating systems to describe a single event. The Seleucid era counting began in 312/11 BCE.

 
 
   
 , and the 4th year of the 154th Olympiad
 
 
 
 
 
 
 , and precisely 27 years before Herod the Great took the city.
 .
 .
 
 

Assuming that the year of the Second Temple's destruction is the same for both Josephus and Seder Olam, in 68 CE, the following discrepancies are irreconcilable:

Davidic line 
Several vital clues are provided by the 2nd-century authors of Seder Olam and the Tosefta, as to the placement of events in relation to the Jubilee and seven year cycle. Although no dates are provided in ancient records, general time-frames for certain events are also provided by an inference to their relation to either the First Temple's building or to the First Temple's destruction, and which Temple is said to have stood 410 years. Since, according to Jewish oral tradition, the destruction of the First Temple occurred in 422 BCE, a year which also corresponded to the 1st-year of the seven-year cycle, scholars have sought to plot all events described in the Hebrew Scriptures based on these reference points. Other references include such facts (as brought down in Seder Olam) that the 11th-year of Solomon's reign, when he completed his building of the First Temple, was in the 4th-year of the seven-year cycle, or, similarly, that Jehoiachin's exile began 25 years before the next Jubilee and during the fourth year of a Sabbatical year, or that the 18th-year of Josiah's reign was the year of Jubilee, and that the 14th-year after the First Temple's destruction was also a Jubilee.

Moreover, the interval between the First Temple's destruction in 422 BCE and the Second Temple's destruction in 68 CE is put at 490 years.

In the Jewish custom of recollecting regnal years of kings, the 1st day of the lunar month Nisan marks a New Year for kings, meaning, from this date was calculated the years of the reign of Israelite kings; thus if a king was enthroned in the preceding month, Adar, he begins his second year of reign in the next lunar month, following the 1st of Nisan. Based on this unique way of reckoning regnal years, if King X died in the lunar month Nisan in the year 2022, and King XX succeeded him on the throne in Nisan of 2022, both kings are reckoned as having reigned one year in 2022. All dates provided in the following table showing King David's line of succession are, therefore, made subject to this caveat.   

If the assumption is made that the date implicit in conventional chronology for the destruction of the First Temple is 586 BCE (instead of 422 BCE, as is found in rabbinic chronology), then 164 years should be added to all the dates in the "Seder Olam chronology" column showing David's dynasty.

Josephus' enumeration of High Priests during the Second Temple period
Josephus painstakingly listed the complete panoply of Jewish high priests who served during the Second Temple period and which, by comparison of dates when each man officiated as high priest, can be used as a time indicator to determine the span of time in which the Second Temple had its existence. It is of primary importance to note that Josephus, who claims that the Second Temple stood 639 years (approximately from 571 BCE), is consistent with his figures and demarcations in time all throughout his histories. For example, Josephus claims that from the Second Temple's building until the end of the tenure of the High Priest Menelaus (removed from office in 162 BCE), there had transpired 414 years, with a total of 15 high priests during that span of time (for an average tenure of 27.6 years per high priest), beginning with Jesus the son of Josadek, and ending with Menelaus. Indeed, a collection of these years amounts to a starting point for the Second Temple in around 576 BCE, within the margin or error for Josephus' figures.

Elsewhere, Josephus makes the remarkable claim that 471 years and 3 months had passed from the time that the exiles returned from the Babylonian captivity to the time that Aristobulus, the son of John Hyrcanus, began his reign as both king and high priest, the beginning of whose reign is put at c. 101 BCE. Indeed, a calculation of these years points to a time when the Jewish exiles were being resettled in the country in c. 572 BCE, one year before the year in which Josephus gives as the Temple's rebuilding in 571 BCE. In Josephus' Antiquities, the same period of en-masse Jewish immigration to the land of Israel after the Babylonian captivity is put at 481 years and 3 months prior to the reign of Aristobulus b. John Hyrcanus, or what would have been c. 582 BCE, some 11 years before the building of the Second Temple.

According to Josephus, there were a total of 83 officiating high priests from the founding of the Israelite nation under Moses and Aaron, the first high priest, until the destruction of the Second Temple. Of these, 28 high priests served the Jewish nation, over a span of 107 years, from Herod the Great until the temple's destruction. The following table, with its approximate dates, lists in chronological order the Jewish high priests that officiated in the Second Temple, from its foundation laid by Darius the Great unto its destruction in the 2nd year of the reign of Vespasian:

Josephus' timeline of high priests during the Second Temple period may have well been within a 420-year span of the Second Temple's existence (according to Seder Olam), although the same timeline given by Josephus does not strain credulity if it had spanned a 639-year period.

Disparities between Josephus and the Hebrew Scriptures
While in the vast majority of instances, Josephus' figures coincide with those of the Hebrew Bible, Josephus' figures given for certain events during the First Temple period often stand in direct contradiction to the figures given for the same event in the Hebrew Scriptures. For example, where the Hebrew Bible (I Kings 6:1) assigns 480 years from the exodus to the building of the First Temple, Josephus wrote (Antiquities 8.3.1.) that it was built 592 years after the exodus. Where the Hebrew Bible (I Kings 11:42) assigns Solomon's reign as 40 years, Josephus (Antiquities 8.7.8.) puts his reign at 80 years. Josephus also grossly erred in writing that a span of 514 years transpired from the time of the first and last kings of David's dynasty (being 21 kings altogether). The biblical accounts for this same period puts it at about 474 years. Whether they are copyist errors or not, such disparities cast a dark shadow on the reliability of Josephus' chronological timetable, since, in his own words, one of his expressed intentions was to convey the history of the Hebrews unto the Greeks, just as they are laid-up in the sacred writings. Many of Josephus' figures differ from those of Seder Olam, a chronography dating back to the 2nd-century CE and where timeframes are more closely aligned to those of the Hebrew Bible, and largely accepted by the vast majority in Israel.

The year 68 CE as a focal point of reference
By counting in retrospect the regnal years of Caesars from this fixed point in time (68 CE), being, according to Jewish tradition, the year of the Second Temple's destruction and which came to its demise in the 2nd year of the reign of Vespasian, one is able to chart out and chronograph a rich past that might vary, in some respects, from the conventional views of modern-day chroniclers, as Josephus provides the avid scholar of history with a schematic chronology of the entire Second Temple period, with its successive chain of High Priests serving under the various rulers, with their respective tenures in office, as well as accompanied, occasionally, by dates inscribed in one of two epochs, the Seleucid era and the Olympiad era.

See also
 List of High Priests of Israel
 Missing years (Jewish calendar)
 Chronology of the Bible
 Timeline of Jewish history

References

Bibliography

 (reprint of 1955 edition, Jerusalem)

 
  (with endorsements by Rabbi Ovadia Yosef, Rabbi Shlomo Amar, and Rabbi Yona Metzger)

 

 , Hil. Shmita ve-yovel 10:2–4
, responsum no. 389

External links
Jewish chronology (Britannica), by E.J. Wiesenberg

Chronology
Hebrew calendar
Oral Torah